In Greek mythology, Phanus (Ancient Greek: Φᾶνος means "light, bright, torch") was one of the Argonauts and the son of Dionysus and probably, Ariadne of Crete. He was the brother of Staphylus, another of the Argo crew. Phanus' other brothers were Thoas, king of Lemnos and Oenopion, king of Chios.

Notes

Reference 

 Apollodorus, The Library with an English Translation by Sir James George Frazer, F.B.A., F.R.S. in 2 Volumes, Cambridge, MA, Harvard University Press; London, William Heinemann Ltd. 1921. . Online version at the Perseus Digital Library. Greek text available from the same website.

Argonauts
Children of Dionysus
Demigods in classical mythology
Cretan characters in Greek mythology